Arunachal Junction railway station is a small railway station in Silchar Cachar district, Assam. Its code is ARCL.

Location
It is located in Silchar city.

Infrastructure
The station consists of 3 platforms.

Lines
The  broad gauge conversion which includes the reconstruction of the railway station started in October 2014 as part of the Lumding–Badarpur–Silchar railway section of the Northeast Frontier Railway zone of the Indian Railways.

References

External links

Railway stations in Cachar district
Lumding railway division
Railway junction stations in Assam
Transport in Silchar